Linda Ann Haʻi Clark is an American politician serving as a member of the Hawaii House of Representatives from the 13th district. She was nominated to the House on July 23, 2021, by Governor David Ige.

Career 
Outside of politics, Clark has worked as an independent process server for the Hawaii Child Support Enforcement Agency. She also operated the Kupono and Friends Day Care Center and was president of the Kaupo Community Association. Clark was appointed to the Hawaii House of Representatives in July 2021 by Governor David Ige. Clark serves as vice chair of the House Higher Education & Technology Committee.

References 

Living people
Democratic Party members of the Hawaii House of Representatives
Women state legislators in Hawaii
People from Maui County, Hawaii
Year of birth missing (living people)